Giorgio Scherer (1831 - 1896) was an Italian painter, mainly of genre paintings.

He was born and resident in Parma. Among his many works, he exhibited an oil canvas in 1870 in Parma depicting; Titian and Odoardo Farnese; Consolare gli afflitti; La mascherata; Filippo Lippi and Lucrezia Buti. In 1882, a Florence; A lesson at the piano forte; An unfortunate news ; exhibited in the next year, at the same Exposition. The son of the soldier ; Il merciaio ambulante'', exhibited in 1884 in Turin.

References

19th-century Italian painters
Italian male painters
1831 births
1896 deaths
Painters from Parma
Italian genre painters
19th-century Italian male artists